The Ulangochuian age is a period of geologic time (37.2–33.9 Ma) within the Late Eocene epoch of the Paleogene used more specifically with Asian Land Mammal Ages. It follows the Sharamurunian and precedes the Ergilian age.

The Ulangochuian's upper boundary is the approximate base of the Rupelian age.

References

Eocene